Lancaster  is a charter city in northern Los Angeles County, in the Antelope Valley of the western Mojave Desert in Southern California. As of the 2020 census, the population was 173,516, making Lancaster the 153rd largest city in the United States and the 30th largest in California. Lancaster is a twin city with its southern neighbor Palmdale; together, they are the principal cities within the Antelope Valley region.

It is separated from the Los Angeles Basin by the San Gabriel Mountains to the south and from Bakersfield and the San Joaquin Valley by the Tehachapi Mountains to the north. The population of Lancaster has grown from 37,000 at the time of its incorporation in 1977 to over 157,000 as of 2019.

History

The area where Lancaster is now located, known as the Antelope Valley, was originally home to the Paiute Indigenous tribe. The Antelope Valley's central geography initially served as the hub of a trade route for tribes trading between the California coast, the Central Valley, the Great Basin, and the pueblos of Arizona.

After statehood, the Antelope Valley again served as a geographic shortcut but for the Stockton-Los Angeles Road and the Butterfield Overland Mail, which had two nearby stops in Mud Spring and Neenach in the 1850s. However, Lancaster's origins as a settlement start with the Southern Pacific Railroad, which replaced the stage coach routes. The railroad built a station house, locomotive watering facility, section gang housing, and railroad track in the location of the town's current center. In 1876 the Southern Pacific completed the line through the Antelope Valley, linking San Francisco and Los Angeles.

The origin of Lancaster's name is unclear, attributed variously to the surname of a railroad station clerk, the moniker given by railroad officials, or the former Pennsylvania home (Lancaster, Pennsylvania) of unknown settlers. Train service brought passengers through the water-stop-turned-community, which, with the help of promotional literature, attracted new settlers. The person credited with formally developing the town is Moses Langley Wicks, who in 1884 bought property from the railroad for $2.50 per acre, mapped out a town with streets and lots, and by September was advertising 160-acre tracts of land for $6 an acre. The following year, the Lancaster News started publication, making it the first weekly newspaper in the Antelope Valley. By 1890, Lancaster was bustling and booming, and thanks to adequate rainfall, farmers planted and sold thousands of acres of wheat and barley.

The town was devastated by the decade-long drought that began in 1894, killing businesses and driving cattle north, though fortunes improved somewhat in the late-1890s following the nearby discoveries of gold and borax. The Tropico Gold Mine in Rosamond was briefly the largest goldmine in Southern California before its 1956 closure. The Pacific Coast Borax Company mine would later become the world's largest borax mine, producing nearly half of the world's supply of borates. The construction of the Los Angeles Aqueduct, starting in 1908, brought growth to the local economy by housing the aqueduct workers and introducing a steady stream of water . The 1912 completion of Antelope Valley High School allowed students from the growing region to study locally instead of moving to distant cities, hosting the state's first high school dormitory system.

The community began a steady growth spurt in the 1930s, starting with construction of Muroc Air Force Base (renamed to Edwards AFB), site of frequent flight tests, including the "breaking" of the sound barrier by Chuck Yeager in a Bell X-1A in 1947. From the 1980s through the end of the program, Edwards AFB hosted a limited number of landings of the Space Shuttle. The development of Air Force Plant 42 in 1958, augmented in the 1960s by construction of Lockheed Aircraft's Plant 10, created tens of thousands of jobs. High-wage employment hit its peak in the 1970s during the Lockheed L-1011 commercial wide body jetliner project, for which all assembly and some engineering and parts production were performed. 250 L-1011 aircraft were assembled and flown from this plant and airfield. Lancaster was an unincorporated community in Los Angeles County until 1977, when it was incorporated as a city, with Arnold Rodio serving as its first mayor.

Lancaster State Prison opened in 1993 and before that Los Angeles County hosted no prisons but accounted for forty percent of California's state-prison inmates. "Most of Lancaster's civic leaders and residents" opposed the building of the prison, and four inmates escaped from LAC in its first year of operation. Nevertheless, by 2000 a proposal to increase the proportion of maximum-security inmates received little criticism.

In 2005, Hyundai Motor Co. announced the grand opening of a 4,300-acre, $60 million "Proving Ground," a state-of-the-art testing facility for cars and sports utility vehicles in nearby California City.

Lancaster is now home to major defense contractors such as Boeing, Northrop Grumman, Lockheed Martin, BAE Systems, and government agencies, such as the NASA Armstrong Flight Research Center, which are all active in design, testing, and manufacturing of a variety of military and commercial equipment. Notable projects assembled and/or designed there include the Space Shuttle orbiters, B-1 Lancer bomber, B-2 Spirit bomber, F-117 Nighthawk fighter, F-35 Joint Strike Fighter, and the Lockheed L-1011 TriStar, a wide body passenger jet aircraft. The region is also proximate to the Mojave Air & Space Port, which is famous as the base of operations for Virgin Galactic and Scaled Composites, the company that designed SpaceShipOne and won the X-Prize.

In 2010, the city opened The BLVD, a one-mile revitalized stretch of Lancaster Boulevard between 10th Street West and Sierra Highway.

City leaders set the goal of becoming the nation's first Net-Zero municipality, wherein the city would produce more clean energy than it consumes. Much of the city's infrastructure including City Hall, local schools, and the minor league baseball stadium are solar-powered. In March 2013, Lancaster became the first city in the USA to require solar panels on all new homes in an effort to make the community more carbon neutral. The rule took effect in January 2014.

War Eagle Field / Mira Loma

Polaris Flight Academy, which opened on the field's grounds on July 15, 1941, trained cadets for the Royal Air Force and the Royal Canadian Air Force. (The school also used two auxiliary fields, Liberty Field and Victory Field.) The airfield had two hard-surfaced bituminous runways, one of 3,100' aligned NE/SW (05/23) the other of 2,950' aligned E/W (09/27).

After the Japanese attack of Pearl Harbor, the flight school began training cadets for the United States Army Air Force on 28 July 1942, being operated by the Polaris Flight Academy as a contract basic flying school (phase 1). The primary trainer in use was the BT-13 Valiant.

In 1944, the flight school changed its name to Mira Loma Flight Academy. The airfield inactivated on 1 October 1945 and was declared surplus in 1946. Responsibility for it was given to the War Assets Administration. The land was then bought by Los Angeles County. The airfield was converted to the Mira Loma Detention Center. In 2012, Los Angeles County closed the detention center. Los Angeles County is currently collaborating with the City of Lancaster, the faith-based community, and the non-profit community to convert the facility into a winter shelter.

Many wartime buildings, including two still intact hangars, are still in use. On the roof of one of the hangars, the name War Eagle is still faintly perceptible. Flight operations continue at the airfield with a helicopter pad, used by the Los Angeles Sheriff's Department.

Geography
Because the elevation is in the range of 2,000 to 3,000 feet (600–900 m) above sea level, the area, like the other parts of the Mojave Desert region, is alternatively referred to as the High Desert. Some cities and communities within the trading area of Lancaster include Palmdale, Rosamond, Lake Los Angeles, Quartz Hill, Ridgecrest, and Santa Clarita. Residents of these desert cities and unincorporated communities share Sierra Highway, Angeles Forest Highway, Angeles Crest Highway (State Route 2), and the Antelope Valley Freeway (State Route 14) for commutes to the San Fernando Valley and Los Angeles Basin.

The unincorporated community of Del Sur is an enclave of the city of Lancaster.

Climate

Lancaster has a semi-arid climate, bordering on an arid climate. The area within Lancaster is covered by shrublands (80%), forests (8%), grasslands (7%), lakes and rivers (2%), and croplands (2%). Lancaster and its immediate surroundings are part of USDA Plant Hardiness Zone 8b. On average, annually there are 68 mornings with a minimum at or below freezing, and 30 afternoons with a maximum at or above . Thunderstorms are infrequent but do occur in July through September. There a mild frost throughout March, and temperatures begin to climb in April. Spring wildflowers are abundant, including Lupines, the California Poppy, Fiddlenecks, purple owl's clover, California Goldfields, Creamcups, and Coreopsis. Summer nights are cool and the Pacific tree frog or barn owl can be heard.

In December 1979,  of snow fell in Lancaster.

Demographics

2010
The 2010 United States Census reported that Lancaster had a population of 156,633. The racial makeup of Lancaster was 77,734 (49.6%) White (34.2% Non-Hispanic White), 32,083 (20.5%) African American, 1,519 (1.0%) Native American, 6,810 (4.3%) Asian (2.2% Filipino, 0.4% Chinese, 0.4% Indian, 0.3% Vietnamese, 0.3% Korean, 0.2% Japanese), 362 (0.2%) Pacific Islander, 29,728 (19.0%) from other races, and 8,397 (5.4%) from two or more races. There were 59,556 people of Hispanic or Latino ancestry, of any race (38.0%).

The Census reported that 148,374 people (94.7% of the population) lived in households, 1,484 (0.9%) lived in non-institutionalized group quarters, and 6,775 (4.3%) were institutionalized.

There were 46,992 households, out of which 22,021 (46.9%) had children under the age of 18 living in them, 22,108 (47.0%) were opposite-sex married couples living together, 9,481 (20.2%) had a female householder with no husband present, 3,389 (7.2%) had a male householder with no wife present. There were 3,374 (7.2%) unmarried opposite-sex partnerships, and 376 (0.8%) same-sex married couples or partnerships. 9,239 households (19.7%) were made up of individuals, and 3,060 (6.5%) had someone living alone who was 65 years of age or older. The average household size was 3.16. There were 34,978 families (74.4% of all households); the average family size was 3.62.

The population was spread out, with 47,160 people (30.1%) under the age of 18, 18,607 people (11.9%) aged 18 to 24, 42,575 people (27.2%) aged 25 to 44, 35,632 people (22.7%) aged 45 to 64, and 12,659 people (8.1%) who were 65 years of age or older. The median age was 30.4 years. For every 100 females, there were 100.6 males. For every 100 females age 18 and over, there were 99.5 males.

The homeowner vacancy rate was 3.8%; the rental vacancy rate was 9.4%. 90,064 people (57.5% of the population) lived in owner-occupied housing units and 58,310 people (37.2%) lived in rental housing units.

According to the 2010 United States Census, Lancaster had a median household income of $50,193, with 21.5% of the population living below the federal poverty line.

2000
As of the census of 2000, there were 118,718 people, 38,224 households, and 27,674 families residing in the city. The population density was 1,263.0 inhabitants per square mile (487.6/km). The racial makeup of the city was 62.82% White, 16.01% African American, 1.02% Native American, 3.81% Asian, 0.23% Pacific Islander, 11.11% from other races, and 5.00% from two or more races. 24.13% of the population were Hispanic or Latino of any race. 16.95% were Mexican, 0.6% were Puerto Rican and 0.22% were Cuban. Mexican and German were the most common ancestries.

There were 38,224 households, out of which 42.8% had children under the age of 18 living with them, 49.4% were married couples living together, 17.0% had a female householder with no husband present, and 27.6% were non-families. 22.1% of all households were made up of individuals, and 6.9% had someone living alone who was 65 years of age or older. The average household size was 2.92 and the average family size was 3.41.

In the city, the population was spread out, with 32.3% under the age of 18, 9.5% from 18 to 24, 31.3% from 25 to 44, 18.2% from 45 to 64, and 8.6% who were 65 years of age or older. The median age was 31 years. For every 100 females, there were 103.1 males. For every 100 females age 18 and over, there were 101.9 males.

The median income for a household in the city was $41,127, and the median income for a family was $48,276 (based on Merrit Research). Males had a median income of $40,710 versus $27,619 for females (+/- $3,000 per year).

Mexican (16.9%) and German (10.3%) are the most common ancestries in the city. Mexico (44.3%) and the Philippines (8.4%) are the most common foreign places of birth in Lancaster.

Economy
The Greater Antelope Valley Economic Alliance describes five areas as business and industrial parks in the city of Lancaster: Fox Field Industrial Corridor (adjacent to the General William J. Fox Airfield) along Avenue G, North Valley Industrial Center, Lancaster Business Park, Enterprise Business Park, Centerpoint Business Park, and the Southern Amargosa Industrial Area. The former Lancaster Redevelopment Agency is credited with attracting major business operations to the area such as SYGMA, Rite Aide, Micheals, Bank of America, and many more. In 2012 the state of California abolished all local redevelopment agencies. The city's economic development department is now responsible for recruiting large employers and is involved in attracting retail and dining to Lancaster Town Center, Front Row Center, and other retail centers throughout the city.

Another focus of the Agency and the city was the revitalization of Downtown Lancaster. With historic buildings interspersed with modern amenities such as a library and performing arts center, downtown businesses formed the Lancaster Old Town Site (LOTS). LOTS has resulted in the renovation of business facades and attraction of new businesses, including boutiques and restaurants in the Old Town Area.

In 2009, Lancaster had 17% unemployment. Given the strength of China's economy in the face of the global recession, Mayor R. Rex Parris identified recruitment of Chinese manufacturing firms as a high priority in 2009. In early 2010, Mayor Parris led a delegation to explore trade opportunities with China. An essential component of this trade mission was a stop in Shenzhen, China to meet with representatives of world -renowned battery, alternative energy, solar panel, and vehicle manufacturing firm BYD. Introduced to the City of Lancaster by Los Angeles County Supervisor Michael Antonovich and his wife, Christine, BYD was looking to break into the United States vehicle manufacturing market.

Lancaster's partnership with BYD began with the "Home of the Future," in which KB Home utilized BYD's energy efficiency and storage technology to construct some of the first affordable near net-zero homes in the U.S. Through the success of this project, a working relationship was born, which BYD and Lancaster continued to cultivate as BYD Auto prepared to enter the U.S. market. Once the firm was ready to establish its manufacturing facility, Lancaster was its first stop. In May 2013, BYD Auto announced two manufacturing facilities to be located in Lancaster. These include a 120,000-square-foot BYD electric bus manufacturing facility, as well as a separate 44,000-square-foot energy storage system (large scale battery) manufacturing facility. By April 2019, BYD Lancaster had produced over 300 electric buses for US and Canada. Lancaster has the highest solar production per capita in California.

 unemployment is around 6%.

Shopping centers
 Valley Central Way
 Lancaster Boulevard (The BLVD)
 Lancaster Commerce Center Shopping Center
 West Lancaster Plaza Shopping Center

Arts and culture

Lancaster Museum of Art and History
The city has prioritized arts and culture as an economic driver, opening the Lancaster Museum of Art and History, or MOAH, in 2012 locating the new facility in its downtown district known as The BLVD. Originally founded as the Lancaster Museum/Art Gallery in 1986, the MOAH operates four sites within the city, serving the Antelope Valley, Los Angeles County, and parts of Kern and San Bernardino Counties. The museum contains over 10,000 art pieces about Southern California.

The BLVD Cultural District 
In 2018, downtown Lancaster was designated The BLVD Cultural District, one of fourteen California Cultural Districts recognized as a place where culture happens within the state. Within the district, BLVD Cultural District Family Days and the biannual POW! WOW! Antelope Valley mural and arts festival has added nearly 50 murals by both local and internationally known artists to the district. The BLVD project was completed in 2010 and consists of Lancaster Blvd from 10th Street West to Sierra Highway. The multiple festivals have attracted huge crowds in the tens of thousands. The BLVD project was largely accepted as a major success. The Western Hotel (1876) is the oldest standing structure in the city of Lancaster, which was converted to a museum under the California Historic Site program in 1992, is also located within The BLVD Cultural District.

The Lancaster Performing Arts Center, in addition to MOAH, is a cultural anchor within the cultural district, providing a varied array of fine arts from community theatre productions to classical music and various forms of dance. It also draws celebrity performers from across the country and around the world, including renowned singers, dancers and musicians of all genres as well as comedians and variety shows.

The BLVD Cultural District is also home to the Lancaster Aerospace Walk of Honor. Established in 1990 by the Lancaster City Council, the Aerospace Walk of Honor celebrates test pilots who were associated with Edwards Air Force Base. Recognition is awarded for distinguished aviation careers marked by significant and obvious achievements beyond one specific accomplishment. The sidewalk monuments are dedicated to a distinguished group of internationally known experimental test pilots. Five honorees are inducted each year in a special ceremony held in September.

The city has changed from a railroad water stop of the 19th century to a city with many residents and visitors. Lancaster was the headquarters of the "Flat Earth Society" from 1974 through 2001.

The Musical Road
Lancaster has the first musical road in the United States. The Civic Musical Road "plays" part of the William Tell Overture, also known as the theme to the 1950s television show The Lone Ranger. It was first put in by Honda for a television commercial. After noise and safety complaints, it was paved over two weeks later. After complaints in favor of the road, the musical road was reinstalled in a new location, at 30th Street West and Avenue G, near Fox Airport and Apollo County Park, completed October 17, 2008. While it plays the same song, it is now two miles (3 km) away from the nearest residence.

Special events
Each spring, the California Poppy Festival draws upward of 60,000 guests to Lancaster City Park to celebrate springtime.

"Celebrate Downtown Lancaster", a street fair and farmers' market, is held multiple times throughout the summer and features family-friendly activities, street musicians and a variety of specialty vendors.

In October 2009, the city launched the first annual Streets of Lancaster Grand Prix, a professional go-kart racing event, in downtown Lancaster.  In October 2010, the event was held along the newly revitalized BLVD and expanded to 3 days of festivities, boasting an attendance of 35,000. The event is accompanied by a street festival, live music, and a car show.

In April of each year the "Antelope Valley Gem and Mineral Club" hosts its annual gem and mineral show.  This show usually takes place the last weekend of April at the Lancaster High School grounds.  This event usually draws many visitors and local residents as it is a unique opportunity to see rare rocks, gemstones, specimens and hand made goods such as cabochons, faceted stones and hand made jewelry.

The Miss Lancaster pageant takes place every year in June. The winner represents her community at the Miss Antelope Valley Pageant in September and serves as an ambassador for the Lancaster Chamber of Commerce. Notable recipients include Hannah Fernquist (2010), the first Miss Lancaster to be crowned Miss Antelope Valley since 1999 and the redhead featured on the Miss Antelope Valley banner.

BLVD Market is a farmers market held every Thursday year round on Lancaster BLVD between Fern and Ehrlich Avenues.

Other Cultural Assets 
The Prime Desert Woodland Preserve, located in West Lancaster, is a facility dedicated to preserving the pristine beauty of the High Desert and educating residents about their environment through nature walks and educational programs at its unique Interpretive Center. Forrest Hull Park, located near the southern border of the city on its west side and across the street from Paraclete High School, is a popular dog park where local residents frequently gather to allow their dogs to play and exercise together.

In 1996, the city built Lancaster Municipal Stadium (now The Hangar). It was home to the Lancaster JetHawks, a California League High-A minor league baseball team, from 1996 to 2020. As of 2023 it is home to the Lancaster Sound Breakers, a professional baseball team in the Pecos League.

Sports

Lancaster JetHawks
The Lancaster JetHawks were a minor league baseball team of the California League located in Lancaster, California. The team was named for the city's association with the aerospace industry and played its home games at The Hangar. The Lancaster JetHawks were last the Class A - Advanced affiliate of the Colorado Rockies since 2016. In 2012, the JetHawks won their first California League Championship in franchise history. In 2020, MLB revoked the JetHawks' affiliation in a contraction of all Minor League Baseball.

The Los Angeles Slam
The Los Angeles Slam is a team of the American Basketball Association, formed in 2008. The team relocated to Lancaster in 2011.

Lancaster Sound Breakers 
On November 8th, 2022, the Independent Pecos League announced the Lancaster Sound Breakers as an expansion team. The team will begin play in May 2023.

Parks and recreation

Master plan of trails and bikeways
The city's declared intent is to create a connected network of on-road and off-road trails and bikeway facilities to accommodate users of all ages and abilities including equestrians. This network is to provide linkages between residential areas, commercial centers, transportation hubs, employment centers, and recreational activities.

The Master Plan of Trails and Bikeways has been a collaborative effort with a variety of community interests, from transportation, public health, law enforcement, people with disabilities, schools, public and community-based bicycling, walking, equestrian groups and general public. The Master Plan directly responds to citizen input from the General Planning process. The plan will guide the design and development of pedestrian, bicycle and trail facilities to try to encourage people to use healthier transportation modes in Lancaster.

Government

City government
Lancaster is a charter city which utilizes a City Council/City Manager system of government. This system of government provides accountability and responsiveness to the electorate, while maintaining the stability necessary for implementation of a long-term vision.

The Lancaster City Council consists of an elected Mayor and four elected Council Members. As the city's legislative and policy entity, the Mayor and Council Members are responsible to the residents of Lancaster for all municipal programs and services as well as for any legislative matters concerning the city. The Council approves and adopts ordinances, resolutions and contracts and enacts regulations and policies. It appoints the City Manager and City Attorney as well as members of commissions and citizen advisory committees that provide broad perspective in the decision-making process. Members of the council also serve as directors of the Lancaster Redevelopment Agency, the Financing Authority and the Housing Authority.

City Council meetings are held the second and fourth Tuesday of each month, with special or adjourned meetings scheduled as needed. City Council meetings are open to the public and include opportunities for residents to voice concerns and suggestions.

The office of City Manager is an appointed, long-term professional position. With oversight and direction from the City Council, the City Manager sets and implements policy. The City Manager leads the management team to achieve the goals and directives set forth in the city's General Plan and to develop and implement a long-term vision for city growth and achievement.

A Deputy City Manager and Assistant City Manager are appointed by the City Manager to help manage, coordinate, control and direct Administrative Services, and to ensure achievement of operating department goals and objectives.

The current mayor is Lancaster native and local lawyer R. Rex Parris. He was first elected in April 2008 and was re-elected in 2010, 2012, 2016 and 2020. The current City Manager is Jason Caudle, who has been with the City of Lancaster since 2008 and was appointed City Manager in December 2018. The current Vice Mayor is Marvin Crist, and other current Council Members are Raj Malhi, Ken Mann and Darrell Dorris.

State and federal government

Education

Public schools
There are three elementary school districts in Lancaster: Eastside Union School District, Westside Union School District, and Lancaster School District.

The city has taken an active role in education through its Lancaster CARES after-school program created in collaboration with the Lancaster School District. CARES provides learning and enrichment activities as well as mentors and positive adult role models to give children the encouragement and personal attention essential to building future leaders.

The Antelope Valley Union High School District covers all high schools in Lancaster.

SOAR (Students on the Academic Rise) is a specialized high school which is located on the Antelope Valley College campus, but is part of the Antelope Valley Union High School District. It is an Early College High School which integrates college courses into the high school curriculum. Successful students receive both a high school diploma and an Associate's college degree within five years. SOAR High School has an emphasis in mathematics, science, and engineering. In the 2011–2012 academic year, SOAR students received an API score of 945, which is ranked in the top 1% of all high schools in the nation.

In March 2015, two students from Lancaster's SOAR High School demonstrated a blood alcohol content detection wristband at the fifth annual White House Science Fair.

The Antelope Valley Union High School District currently houses 6 Career Academies, all of which include some STEM component: Green Enterprise at AV High School (Project Lead the Way pre-engineering and business); Law and Government at Highland High School (crime scene investigation); Digital Design and Engineering at Knight High School (PLTW pre-engineering, 3D simulations); Agriculture and Environmental Science at Littlerock High School; Health Careers Academy and Falcon Academy of Sustainable Technology (FAST) (PLTW pre-engineering, automotive, construction, 3D simulations) at Palmdale High. AVUHSD also has 3 middle school academies, which include Soar Prep, Knight Prep, and Palmdale Prep.

In addition, STEM career pathways and courses are in place at other high schools, including: PLTW pre-engineering at Lancaster and Quartz Hill High School; Health Science with dental concentration at Antelope Valley High School; Automotive technology at Highland, Littlerock, Quartz Hill, and Desert Winds; Agriculture science at AV High School and Palmdale High; Computer multimedia design at every AVUHSD comprehensive site.

Quartz Hill High School of the AVUHSD houses the district's International Baccalaureate (IB) program. The IB program combines advanced content knowledge with a focus on the development of critical thinking. Earning an IB diploma requires a multi-year commitment across disciplines.

The U.S. News & World Report education site shows the district falls below the California Academic Performance Index Evaluation.  70% of students receive a free lunch, with 8% participating in Advanced Placement courses or credits.

Private schools
There are also several private schools in the city including Bethel Christian School (K-8), Desert Christian Schools, Grace Lutheran Christian School, Sacred Heart School (TK - 8th grades), Paraclete High School, Lancaster Baptist School, Desert Montessori Academy, Antelope Valley Adventist School, Country Christian School, and Desert Vineyard Christian School.

Charter schools
Charter schools include Academy for the Advancement of Children with Autism, Antelope Valley Learning Academy, Assurance Learning Academy, Desert Sands Charter High School, Gorman Learning Charter Network, iLEAD Innovation Studios High School, iLEAD Lancaster Charter School, Learn4Life Concept Charter School, Life Source International Charter School, and Options For Youth Charter School.

Higher education
Lancaster is home to Antelope Valley College, the University of Antelope Valley, as well as a satellite campus of California State University, Bakersfield. In 2005, Charter College was opened. The city has spearheaded the development of the Lancaster University Center to provide local students with a chance to receive a first-rate education in engineering and technology. The $3.5 million reconstruction of Challenger Hall, located at the old Antelope Valley Fairgrounds, gave the new campus 13 classrooms, two of which are high tech distance learning rooms and 2 of which are lab classrooms, as well as office space. Through partnerships with local aerospace companies, and California State University, Bakersfield. Previously California State University, Fresno offered two Bachelor of Science degrees in electrical and mechanical engineering in association with the Lancaster University Center. However, CSUF began phasing out these programs in the Antelope Valley in 2010, ceasing course offerings at the end of the 2011 spring term. Beginning in fall 2011, California State University, Long Beach will now be offering Bachelor of Science degrees in electrical and mechanical engineering at the LUC, ensuring students in the Antelope Valley will receive a first-rate education without leaving the area.

Antelope Valley College
Antelope Valley College is the oldest institution of higher learning in the Antelope Valley. It was founded in 1929 on the campus of Antelope Valley High School. In the mid-1950s, it moved to its current location.

California State University, Bakersfield-Antelope Valley
California State University, Bakersfield-Antelope Valley (CSUB-AV) is located on the north side of the Antelope Valley College campus. Many bachelor's and master's degrees are offered on this campus.

West Coast Baptist College
Lancaster is also home to West Coast Baptist College, an accredited independent Baptist Bible College offering graduate and undergraduate degrees in pastoral studies, evangelism, missions, church ministries, music, Christian education, youth ministry, and secretarial studies. West Coast opened in 1995.

University of Antelope Valley
Formerly known as Antelope Valley Medical College, University of Antelope Valley is a private, for-profit institution approved by the Western Association of Schools and Colleges (WSCUC). In June 2009, the institution received approval from the United States Department of Education to offer Associates, Bachelors, and master's degrees.

Media

Newspapers
AV News
Antelope Valley Press
AV Political Observer
Los Angeles Times

Radio stations

AM
KAVL 610 Sports
KTPI 1340 Adult Standards
KOSS 1380 News/Talk
KUTY 1470 Mexican Oldies

FM
KCRY 88.1 FM NPR (KCRW Santa Monica)
KTLW 88.9 FM Religious/Christian
KLXP 89.7 FM Religious/Christian (simulcast of Hollister KHRI 90.7)
K211EY 90.1 FM Religious/Christian (simulcast of Victorville KHMS 88.5)
K216FA 91.1 FM Religious/Christian (simulcast of Twin Falls KAWZ 89.9)
KWTD 91.9 FM Religious/Christian (simulcast of Bishop KWTW 88.5)
KQAV 93.5 FM Old School
KFXM-LP 96.7 FM Oldies
KTPI-FM 97.7 FM Country
KKZQ 100.1 FM The Quake (Rock)
KRAJ 100.9 FM The Heat Hip Hop
KSRY 103.1 FM Modern Rock (simulcast of Los Angeles KYSR 98.7)
KGBB 103.9 FM Adult Hits
KEPD 104.9 FM Country
KVVS 105.5 Kiis FM (simulcast of Los Angeles KIIS 102.7)
KGMX 106.3 FM Adult Contemporary
KMVE 106.9 FM Light Rock
((KLOS)) 95.5  FM Classic Rock

Television stations
Directory of locally based TV stations, otherwise they get all Los Angeles area on cable TV and sometimes, through the airwaves.
KPAL 38 Home Shopping/ Christian programming.
KAVTV Time Warner Cable News on Channel 3
 KCAL CBS News on Channel 9

Infrastructure

Transportation

Airport
General William J. Fox Airfield (also known as Fox Field) is the local airport serving Lancaster.  Fox Field previously had scheduled passenger air service primarily to Los Angeles (LAX) but no longer has airline flights.

Health care
The Los Angeles County Department of Health Services operates the Antelope Valley Health Center in Lancaster.

Law enforcement

Law enforcement in Lancaster is provided by contract with the Los Angeles County Sheriff's Department (LASD). The LASD operates the Lancaster Station in Lancaster.

The city also makes use of technology in law enforcement, allowing citizens to file police reports with the Sheriff's Department through the city's website. These and other programs are reducing response times to law enforcement incidents. In August, 2012, the city also launched the use of a Cessna 172 aircraft equipped with a remote control camera for use in patrolling the city. Initially, aircraft surveillance was carried out in a single ten-hour shift daily, but its use has been expanded to nighttime hours, as well.

Notable people

Raymond Allen, television actor
Kevin Appier, former MLB player
Chris Avalos, professional boxer 
Pancho Barnes, aviator
Priscilla Barnes, actress 
Lon Boyett, NFL player
Steve Buechele, baseball player
Aaron Carter, singer and actor
Dewayne Dedmon, NBA player
John "Drumbo" French, musician, author
Judy Garland, singer, actress
Donald Glover, actor, writer, comedian and musician; born on nearby Edwards AFB
Noah Gray-Cabey, actor
Buddy Hackett, actor, comedian 
Sandy Hackett, actor and son of Buddy Hackett
Edmond Hamilton, science fiction writer
Bob Hannah, motorcycle racer, AMA 125 & 250 National motocross Champion—Supercross Champion
Jon Howard, musician
Miguel Ibarra, professional soccer player
Al Krueger, professional football player, attended high school in Lancaster and died in Lancaster
 John McKibbin, politician and businessman
Dwayne Murphy, Major League Baseball player and coach
Vinc Pichel, professional UFC mixed martial artist
James Richards, professional football player
George Runner, politician who currently represents 1/4 of California on the California State Board of Equalization
Sharon Runner, California state senator
Dick Rutan, retired airforce pilot
Burt Rutan, aerospace engineer
Chaz Schilens, former NFL player 
Wesley Swift, most prominent of the early popularizers of the Christian Identity movement
Bruce Van Dyke, former football guard
Don Van Vliet, musician (as Captain Beefheart), painter
Frank Zappa, musician, composer, satirist
Patrick Watson, musician
Adam Wheeler, Olympic wrestler
Joshua Kelley, NFL player

In popular culture
The Two Pines Church in Lancaster is a chapel used by Quentin Tarantino in many scenes of his film, Kill Bill.

Lancaster was also used to film spots in Rob Zombie's film, The Devil's Rejects.

References

External links

Lancaster Chamber of Commerce

 
1977 establishments in California
Antelope Valley
Cities in Los Angeles County, California
Cities in the Mojave Desert
Incorporated cities and towns in California
Populated places established in 1977